Canso may refer to:

Places
 Canso, Nova Scotia, a small fishing community in eastern Nova Scotia, Canada
 Canso Islands, a small group of islands off the coast of Canso and a national historic site
 Cape Canso, a cape near the abovementioned community in Nova Scotia, Canada
 Strait of Canso, between Cape Breton Island and mainland Nova Scotia, Canada
 Canso Rocks, Graham Land, Antarctica
 Canso (crater), a crater on Mars, named after the Nova Scotian town

Military
 , a Royal Canadian Navy minesweeper in commission from 1942 to 1945
 , more than one ship of the British Royal Navy
 PBY Canso, a World War II-era patrol bomber flying boat flown by the Royal Canadian Air Force

Transportation
 Acadian Canso, an automobile produced by General Motors of Canada
 Canso Causeway, a rock-fill causeway connecting Cape Breton Island to mainland Nova Scotia, Canada
 Civil Air Navigation Services Organisation (CANSO), an international representative body of companies that provide air traffic control services

Other uses
 Canso (song), a troubadour form

See also